Eiler is a given name. Notable people with the name include:

Eiler Hagerup Krog Prytz, Jr., Norwegian goldsmith
Eiler Hagerup Krog Prytz, Sr., Norwegian bailiff and politician
Eiler Holm (1904–1987), Danish amateur footballer
Eiler Rasmussen Eilersen (1827–1912), Danish landscape artist
Hans Eiler Pedersen (1890–1971), Danish gymnast who competed in the 1912 Summer Olympics
Henning Eiler Petersen (1877–1946), Danish mycologist, botanist and marine biologist
Lorraine Eiler, Australian basketball player
Marcella Grace Eiler (1987–2008), American social activist from Eugene, Oregon who was murdered in Mexico
Steen Eiler Rasmussen (1898–1990), Danish architect, town-planner, writer, professor at the Royal Danish Academy of Fine Arts

Danish masculine given names
Norwegian masculine given names
Scandinavian masculine given names